Dominique Schnapper (born 9 November 1934) was a member of the Constitutional Council of France from 2001 to 2010.  

She is also a scholar and professor of sociology. Her sociological studies have been largely historical and have ranged from inquiries into minorities and labour to others on citizenship and nations.  She has been named a Chevalier of the Legion of Honour, and an Officer of the Ordre des Arts et des Lettres.

She is the daughter of the French intellectual Raymond Aron.

References

External links
Dominique Schnapper International Balzan Prize Foundation

1934 births
Living people
Writers from Paris
French sociologists
French women sociologists
Chevaliers of the Légion d'honneur
Sciences Po alumni
Academic staff of the School for Advanced Studies in the Social Sciences
Officiers of the Ordre des Arts et des Lettres